Puzzle & Dragons Z + Super Mario Bros. Edition is a 2015 role-playing puzzle video game for Nintendo 3DS developed by GungHo Online Entertainment. It is a compilation of Puzzle & Dragons Z and Puzzle & Dragons: Super Mario Bros. Edition from the Puzzle & Dragons series for North America and Europe. The bundled game was released in May 2015 for NA and PAL regions.

Development
On May 3, 2013, GungHo revealed a spin-off for the Nintendo 3DS named Puzzle & Dragons Z during the Puzzle & Dragons Fan Appreciation Festival 2013. The game was released in Japan on December 12, 2013. Gameplay is identical to the mobile game, but it adds role-playing elements such as towns and non-player characters.

Puzzle & Dragons: Super Mario Bros. Edition for the Nintendo 3DS features characters from the Super Mario series in gameplay similar to that from Puzzle & Dragons Z, including an overworld and story. It was released on April 29, 2015, in Japan as a standalone title.

The bundled game for North America, Europe, Australia, and South Korea was first announced on January 14, 2015 and was released on May 22, 2015.

The Nintendo eShop has a pre-purchase bonus by adding a special downloadable creature which is provided by online code found on the electronic receipt after purchase.

Reception

The game received mixed or average reviews according to the review aggregator Metacritic.IGN's Kallie Plagge awarded the game a  score of 7.9 out of 10, stating "Puzzle & Dragons Super Mario Bros. Edition is the shining star alongside the less successful Z." PC Magazine's Jordan Minor also praised Puzzle & Dragons Super Mario Bros. Edition while disliking the companion character TAMADRA [sic]. He states that "Whereas Super Mario Bros. Edition uses its RPG components to enrich a pick-up-and-play puzzle game, Z tries to be a full-blown RPG that happens to center around puzzles." He also states the artwork feels uninspired in Puzzle & Dragons Super Mario Bros. Edition. 

As of July 30, 2014, the game had shipped over 1.5 million copies.

Notes

References

External links

 

2013 video games
2015 video games
Crossover video games
Mario puzzle games
Mario role-playing games
Nintendo 3DS games
Nintendo 3DS-only games
Nintendo 3DS eShop games
Puzzle & Dragons
Puzzle video games
Single-player video games
Video games scored by Kenji Ito
Video games developed in Japan
Nintendo video game compilations